Philemon Tracy (June 27, 1831 – September 18, 1862) was an American judge, newspaper editor, and politician.

Tracy was the son of Edward Dorr Tracy, Judge of the Supreme Court of Georgia.  He was born in Macon, Georgia, in June, 1831.

He graduated from Yale College in 1850. After leaving college he established himself in the practice of Law in his native town, where he edited the Macon Telegraph and held the position of Probate Judge. In 1860, he was a member of the Georgia Legislature. He afterwards held the post of a Major in the 6th Georgia Volunteer Infantry, and while acting as such in the battles near Richmond, Virginia, in July, 1862, he was severely wounded. He died while serving in the battle of Antietam, after being shot in the leg, at the age of 31. His body would then be buried with family in Batavia, New York, where he remains to this day.

He was married to Mrs. Caroline Walker, who died about a year after their marriage, leaving no children.

External links
 

1831 births
1862 deaths
People of Georgia (U.S. state) in the American Civil War
Yale College alumni
Confederate States Army officers
Confederate States of America military personnel killed in the American Civil War
Members of the Georgia General Assembly
People from Macon, Georgia
Editors of Georgia (U.S. state) newspapers
Justices of the Supreme Court of Georgia (U.S. state)
19th-century American newspaper editors
19th-century American judges
19th-century American lawyers
19th-century American politicians